Labeobarbus mungoensis is a species of cyprinid fish endemic to Cameroon in Africa.  It is found in the Blackwater, Menge, Mungo and Sanaga river basins.

References 

Cyprinid fish of Africa
Endemic fauna of Cameroon
mungoensis
Taxa named by Ethelwynn Trewavas
Fish described in 1974